Maxime Brillault (born 25 April 1983 in Tours) is a French football defender who most recently played for Boulogne.

Brillault played professional in France in Ligue 2 with FC Libourne Saint-Seurin, Amiens SC, Vannes OC and Stade Brestois 29, and in Belgium with Royal Charleroi.

References

External links

1983 births
Living people
Sportspeople from Tours, France
French footballers
Stade Rennais F.C. players
Chamois Niortais F.C. players
FC Libourne players
Amiens SC players
R. Charleroi S.C. players
Vannes OC players
US Orléans players
Stade Brestois 29 players
US Boulogne players
Ligue 2 players
Championnat National players
Belgian Pro League players
French expatriate footballers
Expatriate footballers in Belgium
French expatriate sportspeople in Belgium
Association football defenders
Footballers from Centre-Val de Loire